Poropuntius bolovenensis is a species of ray-finned fish in the genus Poropuntius. This species is endemic to the eastern half of the Boloven Plateau in southern Laos where its numbers are decreasing under heavy fishing pressure. However, the biggest threat to this species is the construction of dams which are likely to have a significant impact on this species. In addition the quality and area of its habitat is declining due to conversion for agriculture. The IUCN assess P. bolovensis as Endangered. 
This species occurs in clear, rocky streams at altitudes of 800–1,200 m above sea level where it feeds mainly on insects. It does not thrive in reservoirs. It is not a true migrant but it does make local movements. It is targeted by subsistence fisheries.

References 

bolovenensis
Fish described in 1998